Altay Öktem (born 1964 in İstanbul) is a Turkish poet, writer, researcher and doctor.

He studied at Kuleli Military High School and then medicine at Trakya University. He later devoted himself to poetry. In February 2002, he held a fanzine exhibit at Kargart (Kadıköy). He has written in several magazines such as Yasakmeyve, Hayvan, Penguen, Öküz and Roll and he has participated in several panels, seminars and speeches about subculture, counterculture and underground culture at various universities. He still practices medicine. He is married and has a son.

Works
poetry - Eski Bir Çocuk, Sukuşu, Beni Yanlış Öptüler, Çamur Şiir ve Herşey: Oda Kırbaç Ayna, Sokaklar Tekin Değil, Dört Kırıtık Opera, Parça Tesirli. 
a study on the fanzines, photocopied posters and demos - Şeytan Aletleri. 
novels - Filler Çapraz Gider, Tanrı Acıkınca, Sonsuz Sıkıntı, Bu Kitaptan Kimse Sağ Çıkmayacak
reader - Genel Kültürden Kenar Kültüre: 101 Fanzin 
essays - Hayat Bazen Çentiklidir, Yaram Yanlış Yerde, Sık Rastlanan Hastalıklar Atlası 
research/essays - İçimde Bir Boşluk Var 
memoir/research - Anadolu Yakasının Sıfır Noktası: Bağlarbaşı - İstanbulum 42 
story - Aslında Saçları Siyahtı 
fanzine poetry anthology - Şehrin Kötü Çocukları
children’s book - Çalılar Dünyası

References

 http://www.idefix.com/kitap/altay-oktem/urun_liste.asp?kid=7881 /

1964 births
Turkish writers
Turkish poets
Living people
Trakya University alumni